Pluteus brunneosquamulosus is a species of agaric fungus in the family Pluteaceae. It is found in India.

See also
List of Pluteus species

References

External links

brunneosquamulosus
Fungi described in 2012
Fungi of Asia